Mario Fischel (born 29 March 1958) is a German actor. He had a part in the movie David as the main character.

References

Living people
German male film actors
1958 births
Place of birth missing (living people)